Vitaliy Lilichenko (13 February 1976) is a ski-orienteering competitor from Kazakhstan. He competed at the 2009 World Ski Orienteering Championships in Rusutsu, where he placed 30th in the sprint, 45th in the middle distance, 35th in the long distance, and 9th in the relay with the Kazakhstani team. He won a silver medal in the middle distance at the 2011 Asian Winter Games, behind Mikhail Sorokin.

References

1976 births
Living people
Kazakhstani orienteers
Male orienteers
Ski-orienteers
Asian Games medalists in ski orienteering
Ski-orienteers at the 2011 Asian Winter Games
Asian Games silver medalists for Kazakhstan
Medalists at the 2011 Asian Winter Games